Lophopleura xanthotaenialis is a species of snout moth. It was described by Émile Louis Ragonot in 1891. It is found in the Brazilian state of Amazonas.

References

Moths described in 1891
Chrysauginae
Taxa named by Émile Louis Ragonot